Zayda y los Culpables (English: Zayda and the Guilty Ones) were a Regional Mexican band. They were famous for their romantic cumbias and ballads about love and loss. The song "Tiro de Gracia" (Coup de Grâce), describing a failed relationship, was one of the most popular songs from the band. The song "De Contrabando" was first recorded by the band and years later became a hit record for Mexican-American singer Jenni Rivera.

Death of Zayda Peña Arjona
Zayda Peña Arjona (March 5, 1981–December 1, 2007) was the lead singer of Zayda y Los Culpables.

Shortly before midnight on December 1, 2007, an unknown gunman shot Peña in the back at Mónaco Motel in Matamoros, Tamaulipas, across the U.S.-Mexico border from Brownsville, Texas. Two other people — a friend of Peña and a motel employee — were also shot. Both died at the scene. Paramedics took Zayda to Alfredo Pumarejo Hospital in Matamoros, where doctors determined that her injuries were not fatal. Physicians placed Peña in emergency surgery in order to remove the bullet.

The next day, several assailants entered the hospital, roaming the corridors. Once they were able to find Zayda, the assailants went in and shot her again in the chest at point blank range to ensure her death. The Dallas Morning News stated that the fatal bullet pierced her back; The Independent and Reuters
 stated that the fatal bullet hit her face. She was 26 years old.

Her mother, Blanca Aidé Arjona, works in the office of a public prosecutor as of 2007.

The death of Peña, who had no known connections to traffickers or any criminal activity, and did not write or perform songs about traffickers, has instilled fear and great concern in many Mexican performers.

Discography
All of the albums are under the Discos Musart label.
Enamorada (1996) (As Zayda y Su Grupo, First album)
Como Mariposa (1997) (As Zayda y Los Culpables)
Sola (1998)
Atrévete (1999)
Estoy Enamorada (2001) (As only Zayda with mariachi)
Sensible (2002)
El Amor es Así (2004)
Caída Libre (2005) (As only Zayda with mariachi)
Me Muero Por Estar Contigo (2006) (Last album recorded)

Greatest hits albums 
Como Mariposa (2002)
Para Enamorados (2004)
Coleccion de Oro: La Sentimental (2005)
Recordando a Zayda y Los Culpables (2007)
Grandes Exitos (2008)

References

Mexican musical groups
1996 establishments in Mexico
2007 disestablishments in Mexico